Hexaplex trunculus (previously known as Murex trunculus, Phyllonotus trunculus, or the banded dye-murex) is a medium-sized  sea snail, a marine gastropod mollusk in the family Muricidae, the murex shells or rock snails. It is included in the subgenus Trunculariopsis.

This species is a group of opportunist predatory snails that are known to attack their prey in groups. What is peculiar about this specific species is that they show no preference for the size of their prey, regardless of their hunger levels. 

The snail appears in fossil records dating between the Pliocene and Quaternary periods (between 3.6 and 0.012 million years ago). Fossilized shells have been found in Morocco, Italy, and Spain.

This sea snail is historically important because its hypobranchial gland secretes a mucus used to create a distinctive purple-blue indigo dye. Ancient Mediterranean cultures, including the Minoans, Canaanites/Phoenicians, Hebrews, and classical Greeks created dyes from the snails. One of the dye's main chemical ingredients is red dibromo-indigotin, the main component of tyrian purple or tekhelet. The dye will turn indigo blue, similar to the color of blue jeans, if exposed to sunlight before the dye sets.

Subspecies
 Hexaplex trunculus trunculus (Linnaeus, 1758)

Distribution

This species lives in the Mediterranean Sea and the Atlantic coasts of Europe and Africa, specifically Spain, Portugal, Morocco, the Canary Islands, Azores.
This murex occurs in shallow, sublittoral waters.

Shell description

Hexaplex trunculus has a broadly conical shell about 4 to 10 cm long.  It has a rather high spire with seven angulated whorls, and the shell is formed similar to the shape of a fish. The shell is variable in sculpture and coloring with dark banding, in four varieties. The ribs sometimes develop thickenings or spines and give the shell a rough appearance. The shell is often covered in algae, which camouflages it, making it appear very similar to the seabed.

Human use 
Snail secretions were used as dye in ancient times. People still eat the snail in Spain and Portugal.

As ancient dye
The purple dye originated in Phoenician colonies. The Phoenician port cities on the coast of current-day Lebanon, exported the dye across the Mediterranean. 

The ancient method for mass-producing blue dye from Hexaplex trunculus has not been successfully reproduced; only today, with stronger, and therefore a less amount of reduction agents, which are more transparent, can we break the original purplish hue molecule and degraded by introducing it to UV sun rays, and as a result get a mere blue color, only. Therefore, archeologists have confirmed Hexaplex trunculus as the species used to create the purple-blue dye; large numbers of shells were recovered from inside ancient live-storage chambers that were used for harvesting. Apparently, 10- to 12,000 shells yielded only one gram of dye. Because of this, the dye was highly prized. Also known as Royal Purple, it was prohibitively expensive and was only used by the highest ranking aristocracy.

A similar dye, Tyrian purple, which is purple-red in color, was made from a related species of marine snail, Murex brandaris. This dye (alternatively known as imperial purple, see purple) was also prohibitively expensive.

Jews may have used the pigment from the shells to create a sky-blue, tekhelet, dye to put on the fringes that the Torah specifies for the corner of the prayer shawl. This blue dye would have been made by taking the yellow dye solution and letting it sit in the sunlight, and then dipping the wool in it. This dye was lost to history until it was rediscovered by Professor Otto Elsner of the Shenkar College of Fibers in Haifa. Since then, it has been re-introduced as the authentic tekhelet and has once again been reinstated to the Jewish garment  although only with limited acceptance.

References

 Ruppert, E.E., R.S. Fox and R.D. Barnes 2004 Invertebrate Zoology. A functional evolutionary approach. 7th Ed. Brooks/Cole, Thomson Learning learning, Inc. 990 p.
 Templado, J. and R. Villanueva 2010 Checklist of Phylum Mollusca. pp. 148-198 In Coll, M., et al., 2010. The biodiversity of the Mediterranean Sea: estimates, patterns, and threats. PLoS ONE 5(8):36pp
 Settepassi F. (1970). Atlante malacologico dei molluschi marini viventi nel Mediterraneo Vol. 1. [Malacologial atlas of living marine molluscs in Mediterranean Sea, Vol. 1.].Museo di Zoologia del Communedi.Roma
 Coen G. (1933). Saggio di una Sylloge Molluscorum Adriaticorum. Memorie del Regio Comitato Talassografico Italiano 192: pp. i-vii, 1-186

External links
 
 Linnaeus, C. (1758). Systema Naturae per regna tria naturae, secundum classes, ordines, genera, species, cum characteribus, differentiis, synonymis, locis. Editio decima, reformata [10th revised edition, vol. 1: 824 pp. Laurentius Salvius: Holmiae.]
 Danilo F. & Sandri G. B. (1856). Elenco nominale dei gasteropodi testacei marini raccolti nei dintorni di Zara. pp. 107-150, In: Programma dell'I.R. ginnasio completo di prima classe: in Zara alla fine dell'anno scolastico 1855-1856. Zara, Tipografia Governiale.
 Risso, A. (1826-1827). Histoire naturelle des principales productions de l'Europe Méridionale et particulièrement de celles des environs de Nice et des Alpes Maritimes. Paris, Levrault:. . 3(XVI): 1-480, 14 pls.
 Lamarck, [J.-B. M. de. (1822). Histoire naturelle des animaux sans vertèbres. Tome septième. Paris: published by the Author, 711 pp]
 Gregorio A. de. (1884-1885). Studi su talune conchiglie mediterranee viventi e fossili con una rivista del genere Vulsella. Bullettino della Società Malacologica Italiana. 10: 36-128 [1884, 129-288 [1885], pl. 1-5]
 Gofas, S.; Le Renard, J.; Bouchet, P. (2001). Mollusca. in: Costello, M.J. et al. (eds), European Register of Marine Species: a check-list of the marine species in Europe and a bibliography of guides to their identification. Patrimoines Naturels. 50: 180-213

Hexaplex